Gilula's lines are three arcs drawn on an AP radiograph of the wrist used to assess the alignment of the carpal bones.

Clinical use

There should be no step-off in the contour of the lines when drawn on a normal wrist.

References

External links
 Radiopaedia

Musculoskeletal radiographic signs